The Carastelec is a left tributary of the river Crasna in Romania. It discharges into the Crasna in Măeriște.

References

Rivers of Romania
Rivers of Sălaj County